Bluecrest may refer to:

Bluecrest Allblue Fund, managed by BlueCrest Limited
BlueCrest Capital Management, a hedge fund which also operates under related names
Bluecrest University College and Bluecrest College in Ghana 
Bluecrest Wellness, a health screening company
Bluecrest, a predecessor of Young's Seafood